Calopteryx angustipennis is a species of damselfly in the family Calopterygidae known commonly as the Appalachian jewelwing. It is endemic to the United States, where it occurs in the southeastern and eastern states as far north as New York. It lives near rivers and streams, especially near riffles.

References 

Calopterygidae
Odonata of North America
Endemic fauna of the United States
Insects of the United States
Insects described in 1853
Taxonomy articles created by Polbot